Silavar may refer to:
Şilavar, Azerbaijan
Silav, Iran